Sagbladet Ridge is a rock ridge at the east side of the mouth of the Austreskorve Glacier, in the Muhlig-Hofmann Mountains of Queen Maud Land. Plotted from surveys and air photos by Norwegian Antarctic Expedition (1956–60) and named Sagbladet (the saw blade).

Ridges of Queen Maud Land
Princess Astrid Coast